Kyaraly may refer to:
 Bakrabad, East Azerbaijan
 Karaviq